Aspar Team (formerly Ángel Nieto Team) is a Grand Prix motorcycle racing team from Spain, competing in the Moto2, Moto3 and MotoE World Championships.

History
The team was created by former world champion Jorge Martínez in 1992, when he was still riding a Honda RS125R. For 1993 Martínez expanded his operations into the 250cc class debuting with Juan Borja. For the next two seasons the Aspar team switched to Yamaha TZ125 bikes leaving the 250cc division. In 1996 Aspar started an 18-year relationship with Aprilia; in those years he fielded riders like Fonsi Nieto and Arnaud Vincent before entering the 250cc class again, in 2000 with Alex Debón. Between 2006 and 2011 the Aspar team won four World Championship titles in the 125cc class with Álvaro Bautista, Gábor Talmácsi, Julián Simón and Nicolás Terol. Riders that competed with the team in the 250cc class included Toni Elías, Alex de Angelis, Sebastián Porto and Randy de Puniet.

In the  season the Aspar team entered the MotoGP class with Héctor Barberá, who finished in twelfth place aboard a Ducati Desmosedici GP10. Simón finished in second place in the inaugural Moto2 campaign, with teammate Mike Di Meglio finishing in twentieth place. Both riders started the season on Honda-powered RSV Motors frames, switching to a Suter chassis after two races. Nicolás Terol finished in second place in the 125cc class while his teammate Bradley Smith finished fourth, both riding Aprilia RSA 125 motorcycles.

Aleix Espargaró and Randy de Puniet dominated the recently created CRT (Claiming Rule Teams) class for two straight years. In , Aspar entered two Honda bikes, after hiring former World Champion Nicky Hayden to partner Hiroshi Aoyama. The duo scored points regularly, but Espargaró claimed a 3rd straight title in the CRT class with Forward Racing.

Before the  season began, the team changed their name from Aspar Racing Team to Ángel Nieto Team, as a tribute by former team principal Jorge Fernandez to his late compatriot Ángel Nieto. The team also announced Ángel's son Gelete as the new team principal.

Results

Notes
* Season still in progress.

MotoGP results
(key) (Races in bold indicate pole position; races in italics indicate fastest lap)

Notes
* Season still in progress.

References

External links

Motorcycle racing teams
Motorcycle racing teams established in 1992
1992 establishments in Spain